Hydroporus subpubescens is a species in the family Dytiscidae ("predaceous diving beetles"), in the order Coleoptera ("beetles").
It is found in North America.

References

Further reading
 Arnett, R. H. Jr., and M. C. Thomas. (eds.). (21 December 2000) American Beetles, Volume I: Archostemata, Myxophaga, Adephaga, Polyphaga: Staphyliniformia. CRC Press LLC, Boca Raton, Florida. 
 D.J. Larson, Y. Alarie, and R.E. Roughley. (2001). Predaceous Diving Beetles (Coleoptera: Dytiscidae) of the Nearctic Region, with emphasis on the fauna of Canada and Alaska. NRC 43253.
 Nilsson, Anders N. (2001). World Catalogue of Insects, volume 3: Dytiscidae (Coleoptera), 395.
 Richard E. White. (1983). Peterson Field Guides: Beetles. Houghton Mifflin Company.
 Ross H. Arnett. (2000). American Insects: A Handbook of the Insects of America North of Mexico. CRC Press.
 Webster, Reginald P. (2008). "New predaceous diving beetle (Coleoptera: Dytiscidae) records for New Brunswick and Canada with new distribution information on some rarely collected species". Journal of the Acadian Entomological Society, vol. 4, 38–45.

External links
NCBI Taxonomy Browser, Hydroporus subpubescens

Dytiscidae
Beetles described in 1852